Ramagiri may refer to places in India:
 Ramagiri, Badalapur, Mumbai, Maharashtra
 Ramagiri, Anantapur district, Andhra Pradesh
 Ramagiri, Chittoor district, Andhra Pradesh
 Ramagiri Fort, Telangana